zConvert is a closed-source freeware frontend for ffmpeg / libavcodec. It allows the user to convert between audio and video file formats.

Features

zConvert features a custom preset system so that regular options can be stored and quickly used again, as well as built in device support for iPod Video, iPhone and PlayStation 3.

References 

 http://www.zuvium.com/convert/
 http://www.videohelp.com/tools/ffmpeg

Windows-only freeware
Windows multimedia software
Video conversion software